The 1919 LSU Tigers football team represented the LSU Tigers of Louisiana State University during the 1919 college football season.

Schedule

References

LSU
LSU Tigers football seasons
LSU Tigers football